HMS Grasshopper was a Cruizer-class brig-sloop of the Royal Navy. She was launched in 1806, captured several vessels, and took part in two notable actions before the Dutch captured her in 1811. She then served The Netherlands navy until she was broken up in 1822.

British naval service
Commander Thomas Searle commissioned Grasshopper in November 1806. He then sailed her for the Mediterranean on 1 February 1807.

Early in the morning of 7 November, boats from HMS Renommee and Grasshopper cut out a Spanish brig and a French tartan, each armed with six guns, from under the Torre de Estacio. The prize crews were not able to prevent winds and tides from causing the two vessels to ground. The boats and the two vessels were under a constant fire from the tower that wounded several prisoners. After about three hours the British abandoned their prizes as they could not free them and were unwilling to set fire to them as the captured vessels had prisoners and women and children aboard, many of whom were wounded. The British had two men badly wounded in the action; although the enemy suffered many wounded, they apparently had no deaths.

That same day Grasshopper captured the American schooner Henrietta, Joseph Dawson, master.

Then in December Grasshopper and HMS Renommee were detached to sail off Cartagena to monitor the Spanish squadron there. Grasshopper was on lookout on 11 December and sailed ahead, leaving Renommee behind. While off Cape Palos, Searle observed several enemy vessels at anchor. His Catholic Majesty's brig San Jose y Ánimas, of twelve 
24-pounders guns, with a crew of 99 men under the command of Teniente de navio Don Antonio de Torrea, got under weigh, and sailed towards Grasshopper. Two more naval vessels, Medusa Mestrio (ten 24-pounders and 77 men), and Aigle Mestrio (eight 24-pounders and 50 men) followed San Jose y Ánimas. Grasshopper brought San Jose y Ánimas to action. Within 15 minutes San Jose y Ánimas had struck and run onshore, at which point many men of her crew abandoned her and swam for shore. The two other vessels then sailed away. The British were able to recover San Jose y Ánimas, which Searle described  as being of 145 tons burthen (bm), six years old, copper-fastened, well-found, pierced for 16 guns, a "remarkably fast sailer", and suitable for service in the Royal Navy. In the engagement Grasshopper had two men wounded. Searle had no estimate of enemy casualties, but believed that many men had drowned when they jumped overboard to avoid capture. The head and prize money was remitted from Gibraltar and Renommees share was paid out to her officers and crew in December 1813.

On Christmas Day, Grasshopper captured Industry.

Grasshopper captured Neutrality on 4 February 1808. The next day she captured Eliza.

The British destroyed two of the escorts and drove many of the merchants ashore. They also silenced the shore batteries. Marines and sailors of the British ships subsequently captured and sailed seven vessels back out to sea. Grasshopper was badly damaged and had one man mortally wounded and three others slightly wounded. The prizes were loaded with timber for the arsenal at Cadiz. In 1847 the Admiralty awarded the Naval General Service Medal with clasp "Off Rota 4 April 1808" to all surviving claimants from the action.

On 23 April Grasshopper and the gun-brig  encountered two Spanish vessels from South America, sailing under the protection of four gunboats. After a short chase, the convoy anchored under the guns of a shore battery near Faro, Portugal. Searle anchored Grasshopper within grapeshot (i.e., short) range of the Spanish vessels and commenced firing. After two and a half hours, the gun crews of the shore battery had abandoned their guns, and the British had driven two gunboats ashore and destroyed them. The British also captured two gunboats and the two merchant vessels. Grasshopper had one man killed and three severely wounded. Searle himself was lightly wounded. Rapid had three men severely wounded. Spanish casualties were heavy, numbering some 40 dead and wounded on the two captured gunboats alone. Searle put 14 of the wounded on shore at Faro as he did not have the resources to deal with them as well as his own casualties. Searle estimated the value of the cargo on each of the two merchant vessels at £30,000. This action also resulted in the Admiralty awarding clasps to the Naval General Service Medal marked "Grasshopper 24 April 1808" and "Rapid 24 April 1808".

Lieutenant Henry Fanshawe received promotion to Commander and the appointment to command of Grasshopper on 2 May 1808; in June 1808 he took command. She remained in the Mediterranean in 1808 and 1809.

Between 4 and 11 August 1809, the merchant vessel Thetis, Clark, master, arrived at Gibraltar. As she was sailing from Cagliari, a French privateer had captured Thetis, but Grasshopper had recaptured her.

Grasshopper escorted a convoy to Quebec, sailing on 21 June 1810. She then escorted another convoy, of 25 vessels, back from Quebec, arriving in British waters around mid-October.

Grasshopper served in the North Sea in 1811.

Capture
Grasshopper, together with the 74-gun , the ship-sloop , and the hired armed ship  left Göteborg on 18 December 1811 as escorts to a convoy of 15 transports and a fleet of merchantmen, some 120 sail or more. Four or five days later Egeria and Prince William separated, together with the vessels going to the Humber and Scotland, including most of the merchant vessels. The transports and a handful of the merchantmen proceeded with Hero and Grasshopper.

On 24 December Hero wrecked off the Texel in a storm with the loss of all but 12 men of her 600 man crew. Grasshopper observed Hero ground, but too late to avoid also grounding. Grasshopper was able to get over the sandbank into deeper water, where she anchored, though striking ground repeatedly. She was unable to go to the assistance of Hero and within 15 minutes the distress signals from Hero ceased. Next morning Grasshopper observed Hero completely wrecked. Neither she nor the Dutch schuyts could get to Hero.

Grasshopper, though herself safe about a mile away, found herself trapped. She had no loss of life among her crew, though the pilot was killed. On 25 December Fanshawe saw no option but to surrender. He sailed Grasshopper to the Helder and there struck to the fleet under the command of Vice-Admiral De Winter.

Among her crew was the future penal reformer Alexander Maconochie

Ten of the transports of Heros convoy were also lost.

Dutch naval service
In June 1810 France had disbanded the Kingdom of Holland, annexing the Netherlands to France, a situation that lasted until 1813. Grasshopper became part of the Nieuwediep Squadron of the Dutch Navy, which was not amalgamated into the French Navy. The British blockade prevented the Dutch from putting Grasshopper to extensive use immediately and she essentially sat until the end of the Napoleonic wars, though as a result of one pursuit she received the reputation of being the best sailer in the squadron.

On 11 December 1812, the Minister of Marine mandated that the Dutch transfer Grasshopper to the French Navy. The Dutch had intended to transfer a small, 6-gun brig named Irene. Instead, they sold Irene and transferred Grasshopper. On 2 January 1813 Grasshopper was renamed Irene when the French Navy took possession of her. Dutch partisans captured Irene in December 1813, during the Dutch uprising.

After the Netherlands regained its independence in 1814, Irene returned to active duty. She convoyed ships to the Dutch colonies in the West Indies (1815–16), and Spain and the Mediterranean (1816–18). She then served in the East Indies between 1819 and 1821.

In October 1819 Irene took part in the first expedition to Palembang, which the Dutch mounted against insurgents in Sumatra. She sailed up the Palembang River in company with the frigate Wilhelmina (44 guns), sloops Eendracht (20 guns) and Ajax (20 guns), and several smaller ships. However, the squadron had to withdraw after suffering heavy losses and then restricted its efforts to coastal blockade. A second expedition to Palembang in 1821 was more successful, though it did not involve Irene.

Fate
In 1821, Irene returned to the Netherlands. The next year she was broken up in Vlissingen (Flushing).

Notes, citations, and references
Notes

Citations

References

See also
Loss of HMS Hero and Grasshopper: History of Portsmouth 

1806 ships
Cruizer-class brig-sloops
Captured ships